Spink's Lane was a railway station on Spink's Lane on the eastern outskirts of Wymondham, Norfolk. It was opened very briefly in 1845 to trains on the line from Norwich.

The Bill for the Norwich & Brandon Railway (N&BR) received Royal Assent on 10 May 1844. Work started on the line in 1844 and the line and its stations were opened on 30 July 1845. Spink's Lane station opened with the line and was situated east of Wymondham station and west of  station. The link into Norwich was delayed due to the need to build a bridge over the River Wensum that kept the river navigable.

One month before the N&BR opened, a Bill authorising the amalgamation of the Yarmouth & Norwich Railway with the N&BR came into effect and so Spink's Lane station became a Norfolk Railway asset.

However, two stations in the relatively small Wymondham proved to be overkill, and Spink's Lane closed in November 1845 after only four months of operation.

The station building was still extant in 1983 but had been demolished by 1986.

Today Wymondham railway station is the town's sole station.

References

Disused railway stations in Norfolk
Former Great Eastern Railway stations
Railway stations in Great Britain opened in 1845
Railway stations in Great Britain closed in 1845